Cedar was an unincorporated community in Raleigh County, West Virginia. It was also known as Viacova, which had its own post office.

References 

Unincorporated communities in West Virginia
Unincorporated communities in Raleigh County, West Virginia
Coal towns in West Virginia